Westcott is an English surname. Notable people with the name include:
Brooke Foss Westcott (1825–1901), British bishop, biblical scholar and theologian
Burton J. Westcott (1868–1926), American businessman based in Ohio
Carl Westcott (born 1939), American businessman
Carlia S. Westcott, American marine engineer
Carrie Westcott (born 1969), American model and actress
David Westcott (born 1957), British hockey player and cricketer
David M. Westcott (ca 1769–1841), New York politician
Dick Westcott (1927–2013), South African cricketer
Duvie Westcott (born 1977), Canadian ice hockey player
Frederic Westcott (died 1861), English botanist
Frederick John Westcott, known as Fred Karno (1866–1941), British theatre impresario
Genevieve Westcott (1955–2020), Canadian-born New Zealand journalist and television presenter
Gordon Westcott (1903–1935), American actor
Helen Westcott (1928–1998), American actress
Lisa Westcott, Award-winning British makeup artist
Stukely Westcott (1592–1677), Founding settler of Rhode Island
William Westcott (aviator), USAF flying ace during the Korean War
William Wynn Westcott (1848–1925), Co-founder of the Hermetic Order of the Golden Dawn
The Westcott family of Florida:
James Westcott (1802–1880), U.S. senator from Florida
James Westcott III (1839–1887), justice of the Supreme Court of Florida
John Westcott (1807–1888), president of the Florida Canal Company

English-language surnames
Surnames of English origin
English toponymic surnames